Primum Entertainment Group is a media company involved in the production and distribution of filmed entertainment properties and live events in Latin America. Based in Rio de Janeiro, Brazil, Primum was founded in December 2008.

Film Productions
At the Cannes Film Festival in May 2009, Primum Entertainment Group acquired the license to produce Rio, Eu Te Amo the next film in the series of Cities of Love motion pictures following Paris, je t'aime and New York, I Love You.
This film is currently in development.

References

External links
Primum Entertainment Group
Rio, Eu Te Amo
Emmanuel Benbihy - Executive Producer/Creator of Cities of Love motion pictures
Paris, je t'aime - Feature film, 2006
New York, I Love You - Feature film, 2009

Mass media companies of the United States
Companies based in New York City